Off da Chain Volume 1 2000 is a compilation album presented by American hip hop record label Suave House Records. It was released on March 21, 2000, and features contributions from 8Ball & MJG, Gillie Da Kid, Lil' Noah, Toni Hickman, AB Luva, Chico DeBarge, Clinic, Joe, Mr. Charlie and Psychodrama. The album debuted at number 158 on the Billboard 200, number 36 on the Top R&B/Hip-Hop Albums and number 12 on the Independent Albums.

Track listing

Charts

References

External links 

2000 compilation albums
Hip hop compilation albums
Record label compilation albums